Yergüc or Yergyudzh may refer to:
Yergüc, Khachmaz, Azerbaijan
Yergüc, Quba, Azerbaijan